Sergey Slavik Shakaryan was an Artsakhian military, Colonel of the Artsakh Defense Army. He was recipient of the Hero of Artsakh military award and one of the commanders of 2020 Nagorno-Karabakh conflict. He was killed during the 2020 Nagorno-Karabakh war.

Biography 
He studied at the secondary school named after M. Manvelyan in the city of Hadrut, then continued his education at the Stepanakert Agricultural Institute. However, he left his studies incomplete and returned to Hadrut to volunteer to participate in the First Karabakh War at the age of 17. During the war, he served as head of a tank crew. He fought with his father, who was blown up by a mine in 1993.

On 4 October 2020, during the 2020 Nagorno-Karabakh conflict, he was awarded by the President of Artsakh Arayik Harutyunyan the highest title of "Hero of Artsakh". Colonel Shakaryan died on 1 November 2020 during the fighting in Artsakh. He was an only child and was married with two sons and a daughter.

References 

1974 births
2020 deaths
Heroes of Artsakh
Armenian colonels
Artsakh military personnel
People from Hadrut Province
People killed in the 2020 Nagorno-Karabakh war